Nguyễn Thị Ánh Viên (born November 9, 1996 in Cần Thơ) is a national-record holding swimmer from Vietnam. She swam for Vietnam at the 2016 Olympics. At the 2014 Asian Games, she won Vietnam's first-ever medal in Swimming. She has been named Vietnam's Athlete of the Year in both 2013 and 2014. As of the end of 2014, she holds the Vietnam Records in 14 of 17 long course individual events.

At the 2012 Olympics, she swam the 200 Backstroke and the 400 Individual Medley.

Ánh Viên is a serving military officer with the rank of major.

Swimming career 
She began swimming with private lessons given by her grandfather. At grade 5, Ánh Viên competed for the first time at the district level and easily beat her opponents.

She was quickly spotted by coaches of a military team and soon joined the team.

At 16, Ánh Viên was already 1.7 metre tall with long limbs and big feet, considered advantageous attributes of a swimmer.
 2011
Ánh Viên got ten gold medals, one in each of ten categories at the National Championship. She also won two silver medals at the 26th SEA Games in Indonesia.

 2012
Ánh Viên competed for the first time at the London Summer Olympics in two categories: 200m backstroke and 400m medley.
 2013
At the SEA Games 27 in Myanmar (12/2013), Ánh Viên got six medals in total (3 gold, 2 silver and 1 bronze), she broke two Sea Games records in 200m backstroke (2 min 14 sec 80) and 400m medley ( pmin 6 gsec 6),.đShe was voted the "Golden Impression of SEA Games 27 ".

2014 Asian Games 

At the 2014 Asian Games in Incheon, Ánh Viên won the bronze medals in the 200m Backstroke and the 400m Individual Medley event.

28th Sea Games in Singapore

Ánh Viên was one of the top swimmers at Sea Games 2015 in Singapore along with native Singaporean Joseph Schooling. She was the best female athlete at this competition when she captures 8 gold medals, 1 silver medal and 1 bronze medal. This excellent result helped Vietnam secure the second place in swimming just behind host Singapore.

16th Fina World Championship in Kazan 

At the 2015 FINA Swimming World Cup in Iraq, Ánh Viên moved into the semifinals in 200m IM but placed 8 in her heat. In the 400m individual medley she missed the final.

References

External links
 

1996 births
Living people
People from Cần Thơ
Swimmers at the 2012 Summer Olympics
Swimmers at the 2016 Summer Olympics
Swimmers at the 2014 Summer Youth Olympics
Olympic swimmers of Vietnam
Swimmers at the 2014 Asian Games
Swimmers at the 2018 Asian Games
Asian Games bronze medalists for Vietnam
Asian Games medalists in swimming
Medalists at the 2014 Asian Games
Southeast Asian Games gold medalists for Vietnam
Southeast Asian Games silver medalists for Vietnam
Southeast Asian Games bronze medalists for Vietnam
Southeast Asian Games medalists in swimming
Competitors at the 2011 Southeast Asian Games
Competitors at the 2013 Southeast Asian Games
Competitors at the 2015 Southeast Asian Games
Competitors at the 2017 Southeast Asian Games
Competitors at the 2019 Southeast Asian Games
Vietnamese female freestyle swimmers
Vietnamese female backstroke swimmers
Vietnamese female butterfly swimmers
Vietnamese female breaststroke swimmers
Vietnamese female medley swimmers
Youth Olympic gold medalists for Vietnam
Swimmers at the 2020 Summer Olympics
21st-century Vietnamese women